Cheilosia grossa is a widespread European  species of hoverfly. Adults can be found in spring on sallow catkins and the larvae tunnel in the stems of various thistle species.

Description

For terms see Morphology of Diptera

The wing length is 8·5-11·75 mm. Differs from Cheilosia chrysocoma in these characters. Segment 3 of antennae brown to black. Pubescence foxy-tawny. All tarsi segments black.

Distribution
Most of the Palearctic and the western North America.

Biology
Deciduous forest in open areas, clearings and tracksides in woodland and scrub; poorly drained pasture. Flowers visited include Anemone nemorosa, Corylus, Prunus spinosa, Ranunculus, Salix, Taraxacum, Tussilago. Flies in March and April, (later at higher altitudes).

References

Diptera of Europe
Diptera of North America
Hoverflies of North America
Eristalinae
Insects described in 1817
Taxa named by Carl Fredrik Fallén